This is a list of published International Organization for Standardization (ISO) standards and other deliverables. For a complete and up-to-date list of all the ISO standards, see the ISO catalogue.

The standards are protected by copyright and most of them must be purchased. However, about 300 of the standards produced by ISO and IEC's Joint Technical Committee 1 (JTC 1) have been made freely and publicly available.

ISO 30000 – ISO 39999
 ISO 30000:2009 Ships and marine technology – Ship recycling management systems – Specifications for management systems for safe and environmentally sound ship recycling facilities
 ISO 30002:2012 Ships and marine technology – Ship recycling management systems – Guidelines for selection of ship recyclers (and pro forma contract)
 ISO 30003:2009 Ships and marine technology – Ship recycling management systems – Requirements for bodies providing audit and certification of ship recycling management
 ISO 30004:2012 Ships and marine technology – Ship recycling management systems – Guidelines for the implementation of ISO 30000
 ISO 30005:2012 Ships and marine technology – Ship recycling management systems – Information control for hazardous materials in the manufacturing chain of shipbuilding and ship operations
 ISO 30006:2010 Ship recycling management systems – Diagrams to show the location of hazardous materials on board ships
 ISO 30007:2010 Ships and marine technology – Measures to prevent asbestos emission and exposure during ship recycling
 ISO 30042:2019 Management of terminology resources — TermBase eXchange (TBX) 
 ISO/IEC 30071 Information technology — Development of user interface accessibility
 ISO/IEC 30071-1:2019 Part 1: Code of practice for creating accessible ICT products and services
 ISO/IEC 30100 Information technology – Home network resource management
 ISO/IEC 30100-1:2016 Part 1: Requirements
 ISO/IEC 30100-2:2016 Part 2: Architecture
 ISO/IEC 30100-3:2016 Part 3: Management application
 ISO/IEC 30101:2014 Information technology – Sensor networks: Sensor network and its interfaces for smart grid system
 ISO/IEC TR 30102:2012 Information technology – Distributed Application Platforms and Services (DAPS) – General technical principles of Service Oriented Architecture
 ISO/IEC TS 30103:2015 Software and Systems Engineering – Lifecycle Processes – Framework for Product Quality Achievement
 ISO/IEC TS 30104:2015 Information Technology – Security Techniques – Physical Security Attacks, Mitigation Techniques and Security Requirements
 ISO/IEC 30105 Information technology – IT Enabled Services-Business Process Outsourcing (ITES-BPO) lifecycle processes
 ISO/IEC 30105-1:2016 Part 1: Process reference model (PRM)
 ISO/IEC 30105-2:2016 Part 2: Process assessment model (PAM)
 ISO/IEC 30105-3:2016 Part 3: Measurement framework (MF) and organization maturity model (OMM)
 ISO/IEC 30105-4:2016 Part 4: Terms and concepts
 ISO/IEC 30105-5:2016 Part 5: Guidelines
 ISO/IEC 30106 Information technology – Object oriented BioAPI
 ISO/IEC 30106-1:2016 Part 1: Architecture
 ISO/IEC 30106-2:2016 Part 2: Java implementation
 ISO/IEC 30106-3:2016 Part 3: C# implementation
 ISO/IEC 30107 Information technology – Biometric presentation attack detection
 ISO/IEC 30107-1:2016 Part 1: Framework
 ISO/IEC 30107-3:2017 Part 3: Testing and reporting
 ISO/IEC 30108 Information technology – Biometric Identity Assurance Services
 ISO/IEC 30108-1:2015 Part 1: BIAS services
 ISO/IEC TR 30109:2015 Information technology – User interfaces – Worldwide availability of personalized computer environments
 ISO/IEC TR 30110:2015 Information technology – Cross jurisdictional and societal aspects of implementation of biometric technologies – Biometrics and children
 ISO/IEC 30111:2013 Information technology – Security techniques – Vulnerability handling processes
 ISO/IEC TR 30112:2014 Information technology – Specification methods for cultural conventions
 ISO/IEC 30113 Information technology – Gesture-based interfaces across devices and methods
 ISO/IEC 30113-1:2015 Part 1: Framework
 ISO/IEC 30113-11:2017 Part 11: Single-point gestures for common system
 ISO/IEC TR 30114 Information technology – Extensions of Office Open XML file formats
 ISO/IEC TR 30114-1:2016 Part 1: Guidelines
 ISO/IEC 30114-2:2018 Part 2: Character repertoire checking
 ISO/IEC 30116:2016 Information technology – Automatic identification and data capture techniques – Optical Character Recognition (OCR) quality testing
 ISO/IEC TR 30117:2014 Information technology – Guide to on-card biometric comparison standards and applications
 ISO/IEC 30121:2015 Information technology – Governance of digital forensic risk framework
 ISO/IEC 30122 Information technology – User interfaces – Voice commands
 ISO/IEC 30122-1:2016 Part 1: Framework and general guidance
 ISO/IEC 30122-2:2017 Part 2: Constructing and testing
 ISO/IEC 30122-3:2017 Part 3: Translation and localization
 ISO/IEC 30122-4:2016 Part 4: Management of voice command registration
 ISO/IEC TR 30125:2016 Information technology – Biometrics used with mobile devices
 ISO/IEC 30128:2014 Information technology – Sensor networks – Generic Sensor Network Application Interface
 ISO/IEC 30129:2015 Information technology – Telecommunications bonding networks for buildings and other structures 
 ISO/IEC 30130:2016 Software engineering – Capabilities of software testing tools
 ISO/IEC TR 30132 Information technology – Information technology sustainability – Energy efficient computing models
 ISO/IEC TR 30132-1:2016 Part 1: Guidelines for energy effectiveness evaluation
 ISO/IEC 30134 Information technology – Data centres – Key performance indicators
 ISO/IEC 30134-1:2016 Part 1: Overview and general requirements
 ISO/IEC 30134-2:2016 Part 2: Power usage effectiveness (PUE)
 ISO/IEC 30134-3:2016 Part 3: Renewable energy factor (REF)
 ISO/IEC TS 30135 Information technology – Digital publishing – EPUB3
 ISO/IEC TS 30135-1:2014 Part 1: EPUB3 Overview
 ISO/IEC TS 30135-2:2014 Part 2: Publications
 ISO/IEC TS 30135-3:2014 Part 3: Content Documents
 ISO/IEC TS 30135-4:2014 Part 4: Open Container Format
 ISO/IEC TS 30135-5:2014 Part 5: Media Overlay
 ISO/IEC TS 30135-6:2014 Part 6: EPUB Canonical Fragment Identifier
 ISO/IEC TS 30135-7:2014 Part 7: EPUB3 Fixed-Layout Documents
 ISO/IEC 30170:2012 Information technology – Programming languages – Ruby
 ISO/IEC 30182:2017 Smart city concept model – Guidance for establishing a model for data interoperability
 ISO/IEC 30190:2016 Information technology – Digitally recorded media for information interchange and storage – 120 mm Single Layer (25,0 Gbytes per disk) and Dual Layer (50,0 Gbytes per disk) BD Recordable disk
 ISO/IEC 30191:2015 Information technology – Digitally recorded media for information interchange and storage – 120 mm Triple Layer (100,0 Gbytes single sided disk and 200,0 Gbytes double sided disk) and Quadruple Layer (128,0 Gbytes single sided disk) BD Recordable disk
 ISO/IEC 30192:2016 Information technology – Digitally recorded media for information interchange and storage – 120 mm Single Layer (25,0 Gbytes per disk) and Dual Layer (50,0 Gbytes per disk) BD Rewritable disk
 ISO/IEC 30193:2016 Information technology – Digitally recorded media for information interchange and storage – 120 mm Triple Layer (100,0 Gbytes per disk) BD Rewritable disk
 ISO 30300:2011 Information and documentation – Management systems for records – Fundamentals and vocabulary
 ISO 30301:2011 Information and documentation – Management systems for records – Requirements
 ISO 30302:2015 Information and documentation – Management systems for records – Guidelines for implementation
 ISO 30400:2016 Human resource management – Vocabulary
 ISO 30401:2018 Knowledge management system - Requirements
 ISO 30405:2016 Human resource management – Guidelines on recruitment
 ISO/TR 30406:2017 Human resource management – Sustainable employability management for organizations
 ISO/TS 30407:2017 Human resource management – Cost-Per-Hire
 ISO 30408:2016 Human resource management – Guidelines on human governance
 ISO 30409:2016 Human resource management – Workforce planning
 ISO 30414:2018 Human resource management – Guidelines for internal and external human capital reporting
 ISO 30415:2021 Human resource management — Diversity and inclusion
 ISO 30500:2018 Non-sewered sanitation systems — Prefabricated integrated treatment units — General safety and performance requirements for design and testing
 ISO 31000:2018 Risk management – Principles and guidelines
 ISO/TR 31004:2013 Risk management – Guidance for the implementation of ISO 31000
 ISO/IEC 31010:2009 Risk management – Risk assessment techniques
 ISO 31030:2021 Travel risk management — Guidance for organizations
 ISO/IEC/IEEE 31320 Information technology – Modeling Languages
 ISO/IEC/IEEE 31320-1:2012 Part 1: Syntax and Semantics for IDEF0
 ISO/IEC/IEEE 31320-2:2012 Part 2: Syntax and Semantics for IDEF1X97 (IDEFobject)

 ISO 32000 Document management – Portable document format
 ISO/IEC 33001:2015 Information technology – Process assessment – Concepts and terminology
 ISO/IEC 33002:2015 Information technology – Process assessment – Requirements for performing process assessment
 ISO/IEC 33003:2015 Information technology – Process assessment – Requirements for process measurement frameworks
 ISO/IEC 33004:2015 Information technology – Process assessment – Requirements for process reference, process assessment and maturity models
 ISO/IEC TR 33014:2013 Information technology – Process assessment – Guide for process improvement
 ISO/IEC 33020:2015 Information technology – Process assessment – Process measurement framework for assessment of process capability
 ISO/IEC TS 33030:2017 Information technology – Process assessment – An exemplar documented assessment process
 ISO/IEC TS 33052:2016 Information technology – Process reference model (PRM) for information security management
 ISO/IEC 33063:2015 Information technology – Process assessment – Process assessment model for software testing
 ISO/IEC 33071:2016 Information technology – Process assessment – An integrated process capability assessment model for Enterprise processes
 ISO/IEC TS 33072:2016 Information technology – Process assessment – Process capability assessment model for information security management
 ISO 35001:2019 Biorisk management for laboratories and other related organisations
 ISO 37000:2021 Governance of organizations — Guidance
 ISO 37001:2016 Anti-bribery management systems
 ISO 37120 Sustainable development of communities – Indicators for city services and quality of life
 ISO/TR 37137:2014 Cardiovascular biological evaluation of medical devices – Guidance for absorbable implants
 ISO 37500:2014 Guidance on outsourcing
 ISO/IEC 38500:2015 Information technology – Governance of IT for the organization
 ISO/IEC TS 38501:2015 Information technology – Governance of IT – Implementation guide
 ISO/IEC TR 38502:2014 Information technology – Governance of IT – Framework and model
 ISO/IEC TR 38504:2016 Governance of information technology – Guidance for principles-based standards in the governance of information technology
 ISO/IEC 38505 Information technology – Governance of IT – Governance of data
 ISO/IEC 38505-1:2017 Part 1: Application of ISO/IEC 38500 to the governance of data
 ISO 39001:2012 Road traffic safety (RTS) management systems – Requirements with guidance for use

ISO 40000 – ISO 49999 

 ISO/IEC 40180:2017 Information technology – Quality for learning, education and training – Fundamentals and reference framework
 ISO/IEC 40210:2011 Information technology – W3C SOAP Version 1.2 Part 1: Messaging Framework (Second Edition)
 ISO/IEC 40220:2011 Information technology – W3C SOAP Version 1.2 Part 2: Adjuncts (Second Edition)
 ISO/IEC 40230:2011 Information technology – W3C SOAP Message Transmission Optimization Mechanism
 ISO/IEC 40240:2011 Information technology – W3C Web Services Addressing 1.0 – Core
 ISO/IEC 40250:2011 Information technology – W3C Web Services Addressing 1.0 – SOAP Binding
 ISO/IEC 40260:2011 Information technology – W3C Web Services Addressing 1.0 – Metadata
 ISO/IEC 40270:2011 Information technology – W3C Web Services Policy 1.5 – Framework
 ISO/IEC 40280:2011 Information technology – W3C Web Services Policy 1.5 – Attachment
 ISO/IEC 40314:2016 Information technology – Mathematical Markup Language (MathML) Version 3.0 2nd Edition
 ISO/IEC 40500:2012 Information technology – W3C Web Content Accessibility Guidelines (WCAG) 2.0
 ISO 41011:2017 Facility management – Vocabulary
 ISO 41012:2017 Facility management – Guidance on strategic sourcing and the development of agreements
 ISO/TR 41013:2017 Facility management – Scope, key concepts and benefits
 ISO/IEC 42010:2011 Systems and software engineering – Architecture description
 ISO 42500:2021 Sharing economy - General principles
 ISO 44001:2017 Collaborative business relationship management systems — Requirements and framework
 ISO 45001 Occupational health and safety management systems – Requirements with guidance for use
 ISO 46001:2019 Water efficiency management systems - -Requirements with guidance for use

ISO 50000 – ISO 59999 

 ISO 50001:2018 Energy management systems – Requirements with guidance for use
 ISO 50002:2014 Energy audits – Requirements with guidance for use
 ISO 50003:2014 Energy management systems – Requirements for bodies providing audit and certification of energy management systems
 ISO 50004:2014 Energy management systems – Guidance for the implementation, maintenance and improvement of an energy management system
 ISO 50006:2014 Energy management systems – Measuring energy performance using energy baselines (EnB) and energy performance indicators (EnPI) – General principles and guidance
 ISO 50007:2017 Energy services – Guidelines for assessment and improvement of the energy service to users
 ISO 50015:2014 Energy management systems – Measurement and verification of energy performance of organizations—General principles and guidance
 ISO/TS 50044:2019 Energy saving projects (EnSPs) – Guideline for economic and financial evaluation
 ISO 50046:2019 General methods for predicting energy savings
 ISO 50047:2016 Energy savings – Determination of energy savings in organizations
 ISO/ASTM 51026:2015 Practice for using the Fricke dosimetry system
 ISO/ASTM 51205:2017 Practice for use of a ceric-cerous sulfate dosimetry system
 ISO/ASTM 51261:2013 Practice for calibration of routine dosimetry systems for radiation processing
 ISO/ASTM 51275:2013 Practice for use of a radiochromic film dosimetry system
 ISO/ASTM 51276:2012 Practice for use of a polymethylmethacrylate dosimetry system
 ISO/ASTM 51310:2004 Practice for use of a radiochromic optical waveguide dosimetry system
 ISO/ASTM 51401:2013 Practice for use of a dichromate dosimetry system
 ISO/ASTM 51431:2005 Practice for dosimetry in electron beam and X-ray (bremsstrahlung) irradiation facilities for food processing
 ISO/ASTM 51538:2009 Practice for use of the ethanol-chlorobenzene dosimetry system
 ISO/ASTM 51539:2013 Guide for use of radiation-sensitive indicators
 ISO/ASTM 51540:2004 Practice for use of a radiochromic liquid dosimetry system
 ISO/ASTM 51607:2013 Practice for use of the alanine-EPR dosimetry system
 ISO/ASTM 51608:2015 Practice for dosimetry in an X-ray (bremsstrahlung) facility for radiation processing at energies between 50 keV and 7.5 MeV
 ISO/ASTM 51631:2013 Practice for use of calorimetric dosimetry systems for electron beam dose measurements and dosimetery system calibrations
 ISO/ASTM 51649:2015 Practice for dosimetry in an electron beam facility for radiation processing at energies between 300 keV and 25 MeV
 ISO/ASTM 51650:2013 Practice for use of a cellulose triacetate dosimetry system
 ISO/ASTM 51702:2013 Practice for dosimetry in a gamma facility for radiation processing
 ISO/ASTM 51707:2015 Guide for estimation of measurement uncertainty in dosimetry for radiation processing
 ISO/ASTM 51818:2013 Practice for dosimetry in an electron beam facility for radiation processing at energies between 80 and 300 keV
 ISO/ASTM 51900:2009 Guide for dosimetry in radiation research on food and agricultural products
 ISO/ASTM 51939:2017 Practice for blood irradiation dosimetry
 ISO/ASTM 51940:2013 Guide for dosimetry for sterile insects release programs
 ISO/ASTM 51956:2013 Practice for use of a thermoluminescence-dosimetry system (TLD system) for radiation processing
 ISO/ASTM 52116:2013 Practice for dosimetry for a self-contained dry-storage gamma irradiator
 ISO/ASTM 52303:2015 Guide for absorbed-dose mapping in radiation processing facilities
 ISO/ASTM 52628:2013 Standard practice for dosimetry in radiation processing
 ISO/ASTM 52701:2013 Guide for performance characterization of dosimeters and dosimetry systems for use in radiation processing
 ISO/ASTM 52900:2015 Additive manufacturing – General principles – Terminology
 ISO/ASTM 52915:2016 Specification for additive manufacturing file format (AMF) Version 1.2
 ISO 55000:2014 Asset management – Overview, principles and terminology
 ISO 55001:2014 Asset management – Management systems – Requirements
 ISO 55002:2014 Asset management – Management systems – Guidelines for the application of ISO 55001
 ISO 56000:2020 Innovation management — Fundamentals and vocabulary
 ISO 56002:2019 Innovation management — Innovation management system — Guidance
 ISO 56003:2019 Innovation management - Tools and methods for innovation partnership - Guidance
 ISO/TR 56004:2019 Innovation Management Assessment — Guidance
 ISO 56005:2020 Innovation management — Tools and methods for intellectual property management — Guidance

ISO 60000 – ISO 69999 

The 60000 series is reserved for IEC-lead standards.

 ISO/IEC 60559:2020 Information technology — Microprocessor Systems — Floating-Point arithmetic

ISO 80000 – ISO 89999 

The 80000 series is reserved for multi-part standards jointly developed by ISO and IEC, in which some parts are published by ISO and others by IEC.

 ISO/IEC 80000 Quantities and units
 ISO/IEC 80001 Application of risk management for IT-networks incorporating medical devices
 IEC 80001-1:2010 Part 1: Roles, responsibilities and activities
 IEC/TR 80001-2-1:2012 Part 2-1: Step by Step Risk Management of Medical IT-Networks; Practical Applications and Examples
 IEC/TR 80001-2-2:2012 Part 2-2: Guidance for the communication of medical device security needs, risks and controls
 IEC/TR 80001-2-3:2012 Part 2-3: Guidance for wireless networks
 IEC/TR 80001-2-4:2012 Part 2-4: General implementation guidance for Healthcare Delivery Organizations
 IEC/TR 80001-2-5:2014 Part 2-5: Application guidance – Guidance for distributed alarm systems
 ISO/TR 80001-2-6:2014 Part 2-6: Application guidance – Guidance for responsibility agreements
 ISO/TR 80001-2-7:2015 Part 2-7: Guidance for healthcare delivery organizations (HDOs) on how to self-assess their conformance with IEC 80001-1
 IEC/TR 80001-2-8:2016 Part 2-8: Application guidance – Guidance on standards for establishing the security capabilities identified in IEC 80001-2-2
 IEC/TR 80001-2-9:2017 Part 2-9: Application guidance – Guidance for use of security assurance cases to demonstrate confidence in IEC/TR 80001-2-2 security capabilities
 IEC/TR 80002 Medical device software
 IEC/TR 80002-1:2009 Part 1: Guidance on the application of ISO 14971 to medical device software
 ISO/TR 80002-2:2017 Part 2: Validation of software for medical device quality systems
 IEC/TR 80002-3:2014 Part 3: Process reference model of medical device software life cycle processes (IEC 62304)
 ISO/TS 80004 Nanotechnologies – Vocabulary
 ISO/IEC 80079 Explosive atmospheres
 ISO/IEC 80079-20-1:2017 Part 20-1: Material characteristics for gas and vapour classification — Test methods and data
 ISO/IEC 80079-20-2:2016 Part 20-2: Material characteristics — Combustible dusts test methods
 ISO/IEC 80079-34:2018 Part 34: Application of quality management systems for Ex Product manufacture
 ISO 80079-36:2016 Part 36: Non-electrical equipment for explosive atmospheres — Basic method and requirements
 ISO 80079-37:2016 Part 37: Non-electrical equipment for explosive atmospheres — Non-electrical type of protection constructional safety ''c'', control of ignition sources ''b'', liquid immersion ''k''
 ISO/IEC 80079-38:2016 Part 38: Equipment and components in explosive atmospheres in underground mines
 ISO/IEC 80369 Small-bore connectors for liquids and gases in healthcare applications
 ISO 80369-1:2010 Part 1: General requirements
 ISO 80369-3:2016 Part 3: Connectors for enteral applications
 IEC 80369-5:2016 Part 5: Connectors for limb cuff inflation applications
 ISO 80369-6:2016 Part 6: Connectors for neuraxial applications
 ISO 80369-7:2016 Part 7: Connectors for intravascular or hypodermic applications
 ISO 80369-20:2015 Part 20: Common test methods
 ISO/IEC 80416 Basic principles for graphical symbols for use on equipment
 IEC 80416-1:2008 Part 1: Creation of graphical symbols for registration
 ISO 80416-2:2001 Part 2: Form and use of arrows
 IEC 80416-3:2002 Part 3: Guidelines for the application of graphical symbols
 ISO 80416-4:2005 Part 4: Guidelines for the adaptation of graphical symbols for use on screens and displays (icons)
 ISO/IEC 80601 Medical electrical equipment
 ISO 80601-2-12:2011 Part 2-12: Particular requirements for basic safety and essential performance of critical care ventilators
 ISO 80601-2-13:2011 Part 2-13: Particular requirements for basic safety and essential performance of an anaesthetic workstation
 IEC 80601-2-30:2009 Part 2-30: Particular requirements for basic safety and essential performance of automated non-invasive sphygmomanometers
 ISO 80601-2-55:2011 Part 2-55: Particular requirements for the basic safety and essential performance of respiratory gas monitors
 ISO 80601-2-56:2017 Part 2-56: Particular requirements for basic safety and essential performance of clinical thermometers for body temperature measurement
 IEC 80601-2-58:2014 Part 2-58: Particular requirements for basic safety and essential performance of lens removal devices and vitrectomy devices for ophthalmic surgery
 IEC 80601-2-59:2017 Part 2-59: Particular requirements for the basic safety and essential performance of screening thermographs for human febrile temperature screening
 IEC 80601-2-60:2012 Part 2-60: Particular requirements for basic safety and essential performance of dental equipment
 ISO 80601-2-61:2017 Part 2-61: Particular requirements for basic safety and essential performance of pulse oximeter equipment
 ISO 80601-2-67:2014 Part 2-67: Particular requirements for basic safety and essential performance of oxygen-conserving equipment
 ISO 80601-2-69:2014 Part 2-69: Particular requirements for basic safety and essential performance of oxygen concentrator equipment
 ISO 80601-2-70:2015 Part 2-70: Particular requirements for basic safety and essential performance of sleep apnoea breathing therapy equipment
 IEC 80601-2-71:2015 Part 2-71: Particular requirements for the basic safety and essential performance of functional Near-Infrared Spectroscopy (NIRS) equipment
 ISO 80601-2-72:2015 Part 2-72: Particular requirements for basic safety and essential performance of home healthcare environment ventilators for ventilator-dependent patients
 ISO 80601-2-74:2017 Part 2-74: Particular requirements for basic safety and essential performance of respiratory humidifying equipment
 ISO 81060 Non-invasive sphygmomanometers
 ISO 81060-1:2007 Part 1: Requirements and test methods for non-automated measurement type
 ISO 81060-2:2018 Part 2: Clinical investigation of intermittent automated measurement type
 ISO/IEC 81346 Industrial systems, installations and equipment and industrial products – Structuring principles and reference designations
 IEC 81346-1:2009 Part 1: Basic rules
 IEC 81346-2:2009 Part 2: Classification of objects and codes for classes
 ISO/TS 81346-3:2012 Part 3: Application rules for a reference designation system
 ISO/TS 81346-10:2015 Part 10: Power plants
 ISO/IEC 81714 Design of graphical symbols for use in the technical documentation of products
 ISO 81714-1:2010 Part 1: Basic rules
 IEC 81714-2:2006 Part 2: Specification for graphical symbols in a computer sensible form, including graphical symbols for a reference library, and requirements for their interchange
 IEC 81714-3:2004 Part 3: Classification of connect nodes, networks and their encoding

ISO 90000 – ISO 99999 

 ISO/IEC/IEEE 90003:2018 Software engineering — Guidelines for the application of ISO 9001:2015 to computer software
 ISO/IEC TR 90005:2008 Systems engineering — Guidelines for the application of ISO 9001 to system life cycle processes [Withdrawn without replacement]
 ISO/IEC TR 90006:2013 Information technology — Guidelines for the application of ISO 9001:2008 to IT service management and its integration with ISO/IEC 20000-1:2011 [Withdrawn without replacement]

Notes

References

External links 
 International Organization for Standardization
 ISO Certification Provider

International Organization for Standardization